Trnov is a municipality and village in Rychnov nad Kněžnou District in the Hradec Králové Region of the Czech Republic. It has about 700 inhabitants.

Administrative parts
Villages of Houdkovice, Zádolí and Záhornice are administrative parts of Trnov.

References

Villages in Rychnov nad Kněžnou District